The 1946 Masters Tournament was the tenth Masters Tournament, held April 4–7 at Augusta National Golf Club in Augusta, Georgia. It was the first in four years, because of World War II. The purse was $10,000, double that of the previous Masters in 1942, with a winner's share of $2,500.

Herman Keiser won his only major title, one stroke ahead of runner-up Ben Hogan, the tour's money leader.

Hogan won the PGA Championship four months later in August for his first major title at age 34. He later won the Masters in 1951 and 1953 and finished his career with nine wins in majors.

Field
With only one major championship played in 1945, the invitation criteria were modified. Eight amateurs and eight professionals were selected by a committee in February and four further professionals were invited just before the event.

1. Masters champions
Jimmy Demaret (7), Ralph Guldahl (2,7), Byron Nelson (2,6,7,8), Henry Picard (6,7), Horton Smith (7), Craig Wood (2,7)
Gene Sarazen (2,4,6,7) did not play.

2. U.S. Open champions
Billy Burke (7), Bobby Jones (3,4,5,7), Lawson Little (3,5,7)

3. U.S. Amateur champions
Dick Chapman (a)

4. British Open champions
Denny Shute (6,8)

5. British Amateur champions
Charlie Yates (7,a)

6. PGA champions
Vic Ghezzi (8), Bob Hamilton, Sam Snead (7)

7. Top 30 players and ties from the 1942 Masters Tournament
Sammy Byrd (8), Jim Ferrier, Jim Foulis, Chick Harbert, Chandler Harper, Dutch Harrison, Ben Hogan, Herman Keiser, Gene Kunes, Jug McSpaden, Johnny Palmer, Toney Penna, Felix Serafin, Jimmy Thomson

Tommy Armour (2,4,6), Harry Cooper, Bobby Cruickshank, Willie Goggin, Paul Runyan (6) and Bud Ward (3,a) did not play.

8. 1945 PGA Championship quarter-finalists
Claude Harmon, Ralph Hutchison, Ky Laffoon

Clarence Doser did not play.

9. Selected amateurs, not already qualified
Bob Cochran (a), Fred Haas, Cary Middlecoff (a), Frank Stranahan (a)

Ray Billows (a), Harry Givan (a), Chuck Kocsis (a), Jim McHale Jr. (a) did not play. Haas turned professional before the event.

10. Selected professionals, not already qualified
Herman Barron, Johnny Bulla, Ed Dudley, Jimmy Hines, Lloyd Mangrum, Dick Metz, Ed Oliver, Jim Turnesa

11. One amateur, not already qualified, selected by a ballot of ex-U.S. Amateur champions
Tommy Suffern Tailer (a) did not play

12. One professional, not already qualified, selected by a ballot of ex-U.S. Open champions
Al Watrous

13. Two players, not already qualified, with the best scoring average in the winter part of the 1946 PGA Tour
Leland Gibson, George Schneiter

14. Additional invitations
Clayton Heafner, Rod Munday, Buck White, Al Zimmerman

Round summaries

First round
Thursday, April 4, 1946

Source:

Second round
Friday, April 5, 1946

Source:

Third round
Saturday, April 6, 1946

Source:

Final round
Sunday, April 7, 1946

Final leaderboard

Sources:

Scorecard 

Cumulative tournament scores, relative to par

References

External links
Masters.com – past winners and results
GolfCompendium.com – 1946 Masters
Augusta.com – 1946 Masters leaderboard and scorecards

1946
1946 in golf
1946 in American sports
1946 in sports in Georgia (U.S. state)
April 1946 sports events in the United States